is a formerly private university now public (municipal) in Chino, Nagano, Japan. The school opened as a junior college in 1990. It became a four-year college in 2002. Beginning in April 2018, the university became a public corporation.

References

External links
 Official website 

Educational institutions established in 1990
Public universities in Japan
Universities and colleges in Nagano Prefecture
1990 establishments in Japan
Chino, Nagano